National Highway 730B, commonly referred to as NH 730B is a national highway in India. It is a secondary route of National Highway 30.  NH-730B runs in the state of Uttar Pradesh in India.

Route 
NH730B connects Bareilly, Bhutah and Bisalpur in the state of Uttar Pradesh.

Junctions  
 
  Terminal near Bareilly.
  near Bisalpur
  Terminal at Bisalpur.

See also 
 List of National Highways in India
 List of National Highways in India by state

References

External links 

 NH 730B on OpenStreetMap

National highways in India
National Highways in Uttar Pradesh